is the name of several arts. The word kenpō is a Japanese translation of the Chinese word "quánfǎ". This term is often informally transliterated as "kempo", as a result of applying Traditional Hepburn romanization, but failing to use a macron to indicate the long vowel. The generic nature of the term combined with its widespread, cross-cultural adoption in the martial arts community has led to many divergent definitions. The word Kenpō translates thus: "Ken" meaning 'Fist' and "Po" meaning 'Method' or 'Law' as in 'Law of gravity', a correct interpretation of the word Kenpō would be 'Fist Method', the same meaning as 'Quanfa'. However, it is often misinterpreted as 'the Law of the Fist'.

Shorinji Kenpo

 is claimed to be a modified version of Shaolin Kung Fu (using the same kanji).

Nippon Kenpo

Okinawan Kenpo
Some Okinawan martial arts groups use the term kenpō as an alternate name for their karate systems or for a distinct but related art within their association. This can be illustrated by the official full name of Motobu-ryu style named as "Nihon Denryu Heiho Motobu Kenpo" ("Japan's traditional tactics Motobu Kenpo") and by the International Shorin-ryu Karate Kobudo Federation, where Shōrin-ryū is the actual karate style practiced, whereas "hakutsuru kenpo", or "hakutsuru kenpo karate" is a related but distinctive style also taught by the association. Both the "n" and "m" romanizations are used by various groups.

Each kenpo/kempo as defined above has its own techniques and katas and its own roots even though it has the kenpo name; one thing you should pay attention to is the uniform that each kenpo practitioner wears; typically, American Kenpo practitioners wear a black uniform and Okinawan kenpo wear, typically, white uniforms. 
Besides the uniform that each wear, are the names of the techniques and katas, American kenpo being in English and Okinawan kenpo in Japanese.

American Kenpo

Kenpo has also been used as a modern term: a name for multiple martial arts that developed in Hawaii due to cross-cultural exchange between practitioners of Okinawan martial arts, Chinese martial arts, Filipino martial arts, Japanese martial arts and multiple additional influences. In the United States, kenpo is often referred to as Kenpo Karate. The most widespread styles have their origin in the teachings of James Mitose and William Kwai Sun Chow. Mitose spent most of his early years training in Japan learning his family style, Kosho-Ryū (Old pine tree school). James Mitose would later bring that style to Hawaii where he would teach Chow, who would go on to instruct Ed Parker and Bobby Lowe. The system of kenpo taught by Mitose employed hard linear strikes and kicks, pressure point manipulation, circular movement patterns, and joint locking and breaking.

Parker is the most prominent name in the Mitose lineage. A student of Chow in Hawaii for nearly six years, Parker moved to the US mainland to attend Brigham Young University. In 1957, he began teaching the kenpo that he had learned from Chow, and throughout his life modified and refined the art until it became Ed Parker's American Kenpo. It employs a blend of circular movements and hard linear movements. Parker created techniques with names such as Thundering Hammers, Five Swords, Prance Of The Tiger, and Flashing Mace to provide a memorisation tool to the student.

These arts have spread around the world through multiple lineages, not all of which agree on a common historical narrative.

See also
American kenpo
Chinese martial arts
Martin T. Buell – founder of the Universal Kempo Karate Schools Association
Origins of Asian martial arts
Ken Ju Ryu

References

External links

History of Kenpo Karate
Kenpokaikan

 
Japanese martial arts